Radosław Popławski (born 16 January 1983 in Nowa Sól) is a Polish steeplechase runner.

He finished 6th in the 3000m steeplechase final at the 2006 European Athletics Championships in Gothenburg. He was also a finalist in the same event 2004 Olympics, where he set his personal best to finish 12th.

Competition record

External links
 

1983 births
Polish male steeplechase runners
Athletes (track and field) at the 2004 Summer Olympics
Olympic athletes of Poland
Living people
People from Nowa Sól
Sportspeople from Lubusz Voivodeship